Óscar Javier "Ó.J." Morales Albornoz (born 29 March 1975 in Montevideo) is an Uruguayan former footballer who played as a defensive midfielder.

Football career
After playing in his native country with C.A. Cerro and Club Nacional de Football, Morales had two Spanish second division loan stints with Real Valladolid and Málaga CF, subsequently returning in July 2007 to Nacional.

In 2010, after more than 300 official games for his main club, the 35-year-old joined Quilmes Atlético Club, recently promoted to the top flight in Argentina. The following year, he returned to his first professional team Cerro.

Honours

References

External links
 
 
 

1975 births
Living people
Footballers from Montevideo
Uruguayan footballers
Association football midfielders
C.A. Cerro players
Club Nacional de Football players
Segunda División players
Real Valladolid players
Málaga CF players
Uruguayan Primera División players
Argentine Primera División players
Quilmes Atlético Club footballers
Uruguay international footballers
Uruguayan expatriate footballers
Expatriate footballers in Spain
Expatriate footballers in Argentina